Bremer Bank was a fully owned subsidiary of Dresdner Bank with branches in Bremen's districts Mitte (city center next to Bremen Cathedral), Neustadt, Utbremen, and Vegesack. The branches in Bremerhaven were labeled as Dresdner Bank.

The base of customers and staff was added to Commerzbank when Commerzbank AG bought Dresdner Bank.

Since 2010, according to a writ by the acquiring company, the brand Dresdner Bank is only used in Dresden and the brand Bremer Bank is not used at all anymore. However, a trademark protection exists until November 30, 2019. The painting of founder Heinrich Maier was removed and is owned by Commerzbank. In its place (see photo) is now a door leading to the lower level of the Manufactum.

The name Bremer Bank is now used for the landmarked building at Domshof. Commerzbank AG was represented there with a branch until mid-2015.

Due to reasons of landmark tradition the copper lettering 'Bremer Bank' remained on the gable of the building. Above the entrance used to be green luminous advertising reading 'Bremer Bank' which was replaced according to landmark requirements by a copper sign now reading 'Commerzbank' including the logo also in brown copper. The color of the copper writings through weathering in time will turn into a green basic copper(II)-carbonate color which will match the building's roof.

History of the bank

    
In 1856, Bremer Bank was founded by tradesmen and ship-owners and with a significant contribution of Hermann Henrich Meier (founder of Norddeutscher Lloyd). Forerunner of Bremer Bank is Bremer Discontokasse, founded in 1817. Until foundation of the German Reich in 1871, Bremer Bank was a private bank for Bremen. In 1895 negotiations for a merger with Eugen Gutmann from Dresdner Bank were also led by Hermann Henrich Meier. The merger was a profitable business for the Bremer tradesmen; the name Bremer Bank was still used in Bremen.

After Commerzbank acquired Dresdner Bank in 2008 the name Bremer Bank was kept at first. In August 2010 Commerzbank installed a sign in the entrance area reading: Bremer Bank – Branch of Commerzbank AG. The sign was replaced in the beginning of 2012 by a company sign which only had Commerzbank's name on it. This final rebranding was due to a decision made by Commerzbank in March 2010.

History of the building

From 1902 until 1904 the bank building was built according to plans by architects Albert Dunkel and Dietrich Tölken in the Neo-Renaissance style in Domshof (Cathedral Court). Until 1902 St.Petri-Orphanage was located in that spot.

In 1979 the building was significantly expanded by a north-east extension according to plans by Dietrich and Herrmann. A building located next to the old bank building was enclosed by the extension, only a white front in the style of classicism remained. The old bank building was mostly preserved especially the entrance area towards Domshof.

From 1980 until 1990 the building was also home of Bremen Exchange.

The old bank building on the corner Domshof / Sandstraße is listed as landmark since 1994 and still represents the tradition of Bremer Bank – now as branch of Commerzbank. The entrances in other parts of the building ensemble are designed as official access to offices and other institutions. For example, the Bremer branch of Barmer GEK is located behind the white, classical front. In 2016 a branch of manufactum was opened in the counter hall. Today, "Markthalle Acht" (Market hall 8) is located in the atrium of the building ensemble which was roofed, because of the address Domshof 8.

References

External links

German companies established in 1856
Defunct banks of Germany
Commerzbank
Dresdner Bank
Banks established in 1856
Banks disestablished in 2010
German companies disestablished in 2010